100 Streets is a British drama film directed by Jim O'Hanlon and starring Idris Elba. It made its debut in the United Kingdom on 11 November 2016, before being released in American cinemas and on video-on-demand on 13 January 2017 by Samuel Goldwyn Films.

Premise
The film consists of three separate stories that occur contemporaneously within a one-square mile area in London. In each story, the main character must deal with the consequences of his previous actions, as each man struggles to overcome obstacles in the path to a better life. One of the characters is Max, a former rugby captain for Team England and celebrity who struggles to keep his marriage together with his estranged wife, Emily. The film also follows a small time drug dealer named Kingsley, who through a chance encounter with an aging actor Terence, finds inspiration to escape his life of petty crime and his disapproving mother. Lastly, George is a gentle cab driver looking for the chance to adopt a child and build a family with his long suffering wife, Kathy. How each man deals with his personal challenges reveals how circumstance, accidental encounters and conscious decisions determine our fate.

Cast
 Idris Elba as Max
 Gemma Arterton as Emily
 Franz Drameh as Kingsley
 Ken Stott as Terence
 Kierston Wareing as Kathy
 Charlie Creed-Miles as George
 Tom Cullen as Jake
 Ryan Gage as Vincent

Production
Writer and producer Leon Butler penned the script and also single-handedly raised the entire £3 million budget from private equity.

Release
The film was released in the United Kingdom on 11 November 2016, and was released in the United States in theaters and on video-on-demand on 13 January 2017 by Samuel Goldwyn Films.

Reception
On Rotten Tomatoes, the film has a score of 41%, based on 39 reviews, and an average score of 4.9/10. The website's critics consensus reads: "100 Streets strands its talented cast - led by a clearly overqualified Idris Elba - in the midst of a well-meaning but fatally contrived drama." On Metacritic, the film has a score of 44%, based on reviews from 12 critics, indicating "mixed or average reviews".

Accolades

References

External links
 

2016 films
British drama films
Films about interracial romance
Vertigo Films films
2016 drama films
2010s English-language films
Films directed by Jim O'Hanlon
2010s British films
2016 directorial debut films